Odaisseh ( / BGN: Aadaïssé / ISO 233: ; also Adaisseh,  and other spellings) is a village in South Lebanon. It is located close to the Blue Line border with Israel, opposite the Israeli kibbutz of Misgav Am.

Name
According to E. H. Palmer, the name Odeithat et Tahta means "the lower ’Odeitha".

History

Ottoman period
Just north of Odaisseh is a place formerly called 'Odeitha el Foka. In 1875, Victor Guérin described it as "an elevated plateau crowned with the ruins of a small fort of rectangular form, measuring forty paces long by thirty broad. It is in rubble work, with an external casing of regular stones of small size, and is divided in the interior into several compartments." In 1881, the PEF's Survey of Western Palestine (SWP) found here: "A ruined Saracenic building with one cistern."

In 1881, SWP found at the village (which it called Odeitha et Tahtâ) "cisterns and several lintels." It further described it as "A village, built of stone, containing about 250 Metawileh, situated in valley surrounded by arable land. A market is held here one day each week. Water supply from spring in village, spring near, and several cisterns."

21st century
The village was the site of the 2010 Lebanon–Israeli border clash, when Israeli and Lebanese forces engaged in cross-border combat. Some Israeli shells hit the village during the fighting.

Notable people 
 Hussein Amine (born 1985), Lebanese footballer
 Hussein Monzer (born 1997), Lebanese footballer

References

Bibliography

External links 
Aadaysseh, Localiban
Survey of Western Palestine, Map 2: IAA, Wikimedia commons

Populated places in the Israeli security zone 1985–2000
Populated places in Marjeyoun District
Shia Muslim communities in Lebanon